The Battle of Muraki Castle (January 24, 1554) was one of the first victories of the young Oda Nobunaga in his struggle to unite the province of Owari against the powerful Imagawa clan, whose army had invaded the eastern parts of Owari.

Background 

In the spring of 1552, the seventeen-year-old Oda Nobunaga inherited family estates in the southwestern part of Owari Province (around Nagoya Castle). The southern parts of the province were ruled by his cousins, Oda from Kiyosu Castle. The eastern parts were ruled by the powerful Imagawa clan, who at the time also ruled the neighboring provinces of Mikawa, Totomi and Suruga, and by their vassals, the Matsudaira clan (later Tokugawa) from Mikawa.

Also in the spring of 1552, a civil war began between Oda Nobunaga and Oda of Kiyosu in Owari. In response, the Imagawa clan moved west and built Muraki Castle in the southeast of Owari, besieging one of Nobunaga's vassals, Mizuno Nobumoto (uncle of Tokugawa Ieyasu), in his castle of Ogawa. Another vassal was persuaded to surrender the castle of Terumoto, cutting off Ogawa from the rest of the Nobunaga's territory.

Battle 
Oda Nobunaga enlisted the help of his father in law Saito Dosan, lord of the province of Mino. Dosan immediately sent him 1,000 samurai, which Nobunaga left to protect Nagoya from the Oda of Kiyosu, and Nobunaga embarked his army 800 ashigaru armed with long spears and 500 ashigaru with arquebuses  (which at that time were still new weapons in Japan only imported in 1543) on the ships in Atsuta port south of Nagoya and sailed 13 miles along the Ise Bay, landing southwest of the Ogawa Castle.

After personally marching to Ogawa Castle to be informed by Mizuno Nobumoto about the situation, Nobunaga marched his army north and attacked the Imagawa forces in the Muraki Castle. 

Battle of Muraki was the first to demonstrate Nobunaga's military talent, not only was a naval landing on the Chita Peninsula well organized, but  Nobunaga's arquebusiers applied coordinated reloading and volley fire in rotating  platoons, which maintained the ramparts of the castle under continuous fire. The ferocity of the gunfire frightened defenders so much that they surrendered on the first call. The next day Nobunaga took the Terumoto Castle in the same way, burnt it to the ground and exterminated its owners, in order to show his vassals  the consequence of betrayal. Then he retreated to Nagoya Castle and Nobunaga gave his thanks to Dosan's troops under Ando Morinari. later Morinari and his troops returned to Mino.

Aftermath 
Defeating the threat of the powerful Imagawa clan, Nobunaga gained a great reputation in Owari and got a free hand for the final showdown with Oda Nobutomo of Kiyosu. Three months later, Oda Nobunaga took Kiyosu Castle by treachery and united southern half of Owari

It is said Nobunaga shed tears at the scene of mayhem, because many of his retainers killed in this battle.

References

Literature 
 
 
 
 

Muraki Castle
Muraki Castle